is a 2011 rhythm game created by Sega and Crypton Future Media for the PlayStation Portable. The game is an expansion to the 2010 video game, Hatsune Miku: Project DIVA 2nd, and was first released on November 10, 2011 in Japan with no international release. Like the original the game primarily makes use of Vocaloids, a series of singing synthesizer software, and the songs created using these vocaloids most notably the virtual-diva Vocaloid Hatsune Miku. Rock band Gacharic Spin served as motion capture models.

Gameplay

As it is an expansion to Hatsune Miku: Project DIVA 2nd, the game features exactly the same gameplay. The only differences between the two games are the selection of modules and songs available in the games.

Clearing every song in the game on Normal difficulty will unlock the special voiceover version of the Opening Movies of Hatsune Miku: Project DIVA 2nd and Hatsune Miku: Project DIVA Extend, featuring the voices of Saki Fujita as Hatsune Miku, Asami Shimoda as the Kagamine twins, Rin & Len, and Yū Asakawa as Megurine Luka, all in their original human voices.

Song list
There are a total of 50 songs available in Hatsune Miku: Project DIVA Extend; 45 songs (14 new and 31 old) are obtained normally by playing through the game, and 5 songs are only available through Edit Mode.

Songs with a light blue background are returning songs with charts ported over from Hatsune Miku: Project DIVA 2nd.
Songs with a gray background can only be played in Diva Room and Edit Mode.

Dreamy Theater Extend
Similar to Project DIVA and Project DIVA 2nd, a companion game for the PlayStation 3, Hatsune Miku: Project DIVA Dreamy Theater Extend, was released digitally via the Japanese PlayStation Store on September 13, 2012. Like its predecessors, the game features updated high-definition visual improvements over its respective PSP game while featuring the same content and PlayStation Trophies support, and requires the player to connect the PSP (with Project DIVA Extend) to the PS3 via USB to access the content in the game. In addition, the game also supports stereoscopic 3D for the first time in the series.

Live Concert Mode song list
Dreamy Theater Extend features a new mode called Live Concert Mode, which allows players to watch music videos of eleven songs being performed at a virtual reconstruction of the stage of Tokyo Dome City Hall, where the Hatsune Miku Concert: Saigo no Miku no Hi Kanshasai (発音ミクコンサート 最後のミクの日感謝祭) concert was held at in real-life on March 9, 2012 as the second part of Miku no Hi Dai Kanshasai (ミクの日大感謝祭); in addition, the characters also perform exactly as they did in the concert. While watching a video, the camera can be controlled to change viewing angles by using the analogue sticks and shoulder buttons.

Notes

References

External links
Official Site 

2011 video games
Japan-exclusive video games
Music video games
PlayStation Portable games
PlayStation 3 games
Sega video games
Creative works using vocaloids
Hatsune Miku: Project DIVA games
Video games developed in Japan